Un Poco Más may refer to:

Music

Albums
 Un Poco Más (MDO album)
 Un Poco Más, by Guadalupe Pineda, 1985
Un Poco Más, album by Los Palominos, 2002

Songs
"Un Poco Más", song written by Álvaro Carrillo
"Un Poco Más", song by Hombres from Todo esto es muy extraño
"Un Poco Más", song by band Jumbo
"Un Poco Más", song by Luis Miguel from Luis Miguel: 20 Años
"Un Poco Más", song by Verónica Castro from Resurrección